Cannabis in Gabon is illegal.

History
In 1910, European traders in Gabon carried locally produced cannabis.

References

Gabon
Drugs in Gabon